The Dominican Republic men's national softball team is the men's national softball team of Dominican Republic. It is governed by Dominican Republic Softball Federation and takes part in international softball competitions.  The team competed at the 2000 ISF Men's World Championship in East London, South Africa where they finished seventh.

References

External links
 National Federation Website 

Softball
Men's national softball teams
Men's sport in the Dominican Republic
Softball in the Dominican Republic